Corralón was the informal name for the economic measures taken in Argentina at the beginning of 2002 by President Eduardo Duhalde during a bank run in which deposits and debt in dollars were exchanged to local currency at 1.4 per dollar for deposits and 1.0 for debt (this was also called pesificación asimétrica). Previously, the withdrawal of dollars was limited to $250 per week. After the forced exchanged, people no longer had any dollars on the system and those who had savings in US dollars lost 65% of their deposited value.

History

Argentina's situation worsened for several months. The corralito was hardened during the interim rule of President Eduardo Duhalde and turned into a corralón ("big corral"). The corralón differed from the corralito in that most deposits were forcibly exchanged for a series of bonds denominated in pesos. The dollar-denominated accounts were automatically exchanged for pesos and peso bonds at a predetermined rate. The real necessity of such decision was questioned by several observers at the time, and some suggested this move benefited some large companies which were insolvent (or nearly so) whose owners had sent their dollars abroad before the corralito; these owners were thus able to repay their companies' now devalued debts by converting much fewer dollars than it would have taken previously.

The peso was first devalued (from 1.0 to 1.4 pesos/dollar) and then floated, thereby quickly depreciating to a maximum rate of nearly 4 pesos per dollar. Argentina's economy then gradually began a recovery from its abysmal state, spurred by exports that benefited from the heightened exchange rate, and by the declaration of default on most of its debt, which left the government with more money available to expand the economy.

Many private enterprises and also the Province of Buenos Aires were favoured by this measure as they managed to decrease their debts. Nine years later, several people had not yet been able to recover their savings because of the pace of justice in Argentina. However, debtors were able to purchase properties and other items by paying their debts at the 1 to 1 exchange rate.

References

See also

Cacerolazo
Corralito
Fractional-reserve banking

Economic history of Argentina
Presidency of Eduardo Duhalde
Spanish words and phrases